Zahrab (also Romanized as Zahrāb and Z̧ahrāb; also known as Dahr Āb and Zūhrāb) is a village in Pir Sohrab Rural District, in the Central District of Chabahar County, Sistan and Baluchestan Province, Iran. At the 2006 census, its population was 248, in 49 families.

References 

Populated places in Chabahar County